Satya Wacana Saints is an Indonesian basketball club based in Salatiga, Indonesia. Formerly known as Angsapura Evalube Medan, it changed its name to Satya Wacana Angsapura Salatiga for the 2010-11 season of NBL Indonesia.

Record NBL/IBL

Roster

Notable players 
  Nate Maxey (2016–17)
  Jarron Crump (2016–17)
  Valentino Wuwungan (2010–11)
  Respati Ragil Pamungkas (2011–16)
  Tri Hartanto (2012–14)
  Firman Dwi Nugroho (2013–16)
  Sosua (2011–15)
  Yoppie Fance Giay (2010–15)

References

Basketball teams in Indonesia
2010 establishments in Indonesia
Basketball teams established in 2010